Priyani Puketapu (born 27 December 1990) is a New Zealand journalist, model and beauty pageant titleholder who was crowned Miss Universe New Zealand 2011, representing Wellington. There was subsequently controversy, with claims that some of the judges had been pressured to select a blonde. She represented New Zealand at the Miss Universe 2011 pageant in Brazil. Puketapu had previously competed for the Miss Universe New Zealand title in 2009 where she was placed first runner-up.

Puketapu did not make it into the top 16 to quality for the finals of the Miss Universe 2011 competition. Puketapu, of Te Āti Awa descent, is a Wellington-based journalism student. She finished Horowhenua College in 2008.

References

External links
Miss New Zealand

1990 births
Living people
Miss New Zealand winners
Miss Universe 2011 contestants
Te Āti Awa people